Cryptoses rufipictus is a species of snout moth in the genus Cryptoses. It was described by John David Bradley in 1982 and is known from French Guiana and Brazil.

References

Moths described in 1982
Chrysauginae
Coprophagous insects